Synaphea floribunda is a shrub endemic to Western Australia.

It is found in the South West and Great Southern regions of Western Australia between where it grows in sandy-loamy-gravelly soils.

References

Eudicots of Western Australia
floribunda
Endemic flora of Western Australia
Plants described in 1995